Earl Charles Barrington May (September 17, 1927 - January 4, 2008) was an American jazz bassist. He was "one of the most prodigious and prolific bassists of the postwar era".

Early life
May was born in New York City on September 17, 1927. As a child, he played the drums, and changed to the acoustic bass at the age of 14. He "played left-handed on an instrument strung for a right-handed player".

Later life and career
Until 1951, May had a job in insurance while playing in clubs at night. During this period, he played with Miles Davis, Lester Young, Gene Ammons, Sonny Stitt, and Mercer Ellington. He was also taught by Charles Mingus in the early 1950s. Through most of the 1950s he played in a trio with Billy Taylor, and also worked in the late 1950s with John Coltrane and Chet Baker.

From 1959 to 1963 he played behind vocalist Gloria Lynne, and in the 1960s he also worked with Dave McKenna, Herman Foster, Shirley Scott, Stanley Turrentine, Herbie Mann, Mose Allison, and Earl Hines. In the early 1970s he began playing electric bass in addition to the double-bass, and played in that decade with Dizzy Gillespie, Johnny Hartman, Joe Newman, Archie Shepp, Frank Foster, Mickey Tucker, and Ruby Braff.

In the 1980s he did work with musicals both on Broadway and on tour, including Sophisticated Ladies and Big Deal, in addition to work with George Benson early in the decade and Charles Brown later in the decade. Credits in the 1990s and 2000s included work with Dave Van Ronk, Doc Cheatham, Benny Waters, Marlena Shaw, Irvin Stokes, a trio with Jane Jarvis and Benny Powell, Eddie Locke, Charles McPherson, and the international tour of the Statesmen of Jazz. May died of a heart attack in New York City on January 4, 2008.

Discography

As leader

Swinging the Blues (Arbors, 2005)

As sideman
With Mose Allison
 Wild Man on the Loose (Atlantic, 1965)
With George Benson
 20/20 (Warner Bros., 1985)
With Carmen Bradford
 Finally Yours (Amazing, 1992)
With Charles Brown
All My Life (Bulls Eye Blues, 1990)
With John Coltrane
Lush Life (Prestige, 1957–58)
The Last Trane (Prestige, 1965)
With Lou Donaldson
Cole Slaw (Argo, 1964)
With Frank Foster
Chiquito loco: Live at the Hnita Jazz Club (Bingo, 1979)
With Johnny Hartman
 Today (Perception, 1973)
With Jane Jarvis
Atlantic/Pacific (Arbors, 1999)
With Herbie Mann
Today! (Atlantic, 1965)
Glory of Love (CTI, 1967)
With Billy Mitchell
Now's the Time (Catalyst, 1976)
With Dave Van Ronk
 Hummin' to Myself (Gazell, 1990)
With Charlie Rouse
 Takin' Care of Business (Jazzland Records, 1961)
With Shirley Scott
Soul Shoutin (Prestige, 1963)With Marlena Shaw Elemental Soul (Concord, 1997)With Sonny StittFor the Fat Man (Prestige, 1951)With Irvin StokesJust Friends (Arbors, 1999)With Billy TaylorLover (Prestige, 1952)
Billy Taylor Trio (Prestige, 1952-53 [1955])
Cross Section (Prestige, 1953-54 [1956])
The Billy Taylor Trio with Candido (Prestige, 1954 [1955])
Billy Taylor Trio at Town Hall (Prestige, 1954 [1955])
A Touch of Taylor (Prestige, 1955)
My Fair Lady Loves Jazz (ABC-Paramount, 1957)
The Billy Taylor Touch (Atlantic, 1951–57 [1958])
The New Billy Taylor Trio (ABC-Paramount, 1957)
One for Fun (Atlantic, 1959)
Taylor Made Jazz (Argo, 1959)With Benny Waters'''Live at 95: A Birdland Birthday'' (Enja, 1997)

References

American jazz double-bassists
Male double-bassists
Musicians from New York City
1927 births
2008 deaths
Jazz musicians from New York (state)
20th-century double-bassists
20th-century American male musicians
American male jazz musicians
Statesmen of Jazz members